"Lollipop Candy Bad Girl" is Tomoko Kawase's sixth single under Tommy heavenly6, and the fourteenth overall single from her solo career. It was released October 11, 2006 in celebration of Halloween, and peaked at #12 on the Oricon singles chart.

Track listing
 "Lollipop Candy Bad Girl"
 "Lollipop Candy Bad Girl" (Short Version)
 "Lollipop Candy Bad Girl" (Original Karaoke)

DVD Track listing
 "Lollipop Candy Bad Girl" (PV)
 "Lollipop Candy Bad Girl" (short version) (PV)

External links
 Lollipop Candy bad Girl music video on Niconico, published by t h 6

2006 singles
Tomoko Kawase songs